Pearl City High School, is located in the town of Pearl City, Illinois.  The campus is located 12 miles west of Freeport and 44 miles west of Rockford.  It is located just six miles south of U.S. Route 20, a major east–west highway connected to Interstate 90.

Facilities
Pearl City Community Unit School District #200 presently operates one school building that contains all Pre-K through twelfth grade students. The school was built in 1912 and although it has been remodeled and added onto numerous times, is still the school in use today. An updated high school section was added to the building in 1970, including the current gymnasium. In 2003, a significant structure was added to the existing school building to be utilized by high school and middle school students. The high school complex shares space with the Pearl City Park District and includes three baseball diamonds and play field space for physical education classes as well as a football field. The theme for the current school reflects a flexible multi-purpose facility that will allow for both school based and community based activities.

Within the facility, the building houses a modern library; a fine arts department, that includes graphic arts as well as chorus and band; an agricultural department; math, science, English departments, industrial technology, foreign language, and social sciences.  The physical education department includes two gymnasiums, locker rooms, and a weight room.

Academics
Based on the Illinois School Report Card for the 2019–20 school year, Pearl City had a graduation rate of 86.2% and an Advanced Placement participation rate of 1.6%. Additionally, in 2020, Pearl  ducation/best-high-schools/illinois/districts/pearl-city-cusd-200/pearl-city-high-school-6932 U.S. News & World Report]</ref>

Athletics
The Wolves compete in the Northwest Upstate Illini Conference.  They participate in several IHSA sponsored athletics and activities, including; football, girls volleyball, boys & girls basketball, boys & girls cross country, boys & girls golf, boys & girls track & field, baseball, softball, bass fishing and music. Due to their small enrollment, Pearl City coops with neighboring high schools for five sports (Lena-Winslow High School for boys & girls golf and girls track & field and Eastland High School for boys football and speech individual events.).

Teams

The following teams finished in the top four of their respective IHSA sponsored state championship tournaments:

Music Sweepstakes: 2nd Place (1985–86)
Boys Football: State Champions (2014–15)

References

External links
Village of Pearl City
GenealogyTrails.com

Public high schools in Illinois
Schools in Stephenson County, Illinois